"Encantadora" is a single by Puerto Rican singer and songwriter Yandel from his third studio album Dangerous. It was released on October 2, 2015 under Sony Music Latin as the record's lead single. A music video premiered on November 30, 2015. The song was written by Yandel, Farruko, Egbert "Haze" Rosa and Eduardo Vargas, and was produced by Haze. A remix version featuring Farruko and the duo Zion & Lennox was released on March 18, 2016. "Encantadora" garnered Latin Grammy Awards for Best Urban Song and Best Urban Fusion/Performance at the 17th Annual Latin Grammy Awards. It is Yandel's most successful single as soloist, reaching number 3 on the US Hot Latin Songs chart and having more than 420,000 sales plus track-equivalent units between the United States and Spain.

Reception

Accolades
"Encantadora" received Latin Grammy Awards for Best Urban Song and Best Urban Fusion/Performance at the 17th Annual Latin Grammy Awards. It was also nominated for Latin American Music Awards for Song of the Year and Favorite Urban Song at the 2nd Latin American Music Awards and for a Lo Nuestro Award for Urban Song of the Year at the 29th Lo Nuestro Awards.

Chart performance
In the United States, "Encantadora" peaked at number 3 on the Hot Latin Songs chart on April 6, 2016 and at number 7 on Tropical Songs on February 27, 2016. It eventually received a 14× platinum (Latin) certification by the Recording Industry Association of America in 2021, denoting units of over 840,000 song-equivalent units.

Internationally, the song peaked at number 48 on Billboards Mexico Airplay, at number 45 in Venezuela, and at number 24 in Spain, where it charted for 80 weeks from October 16, 2015 to April 27, 2017. The remix version received a 3× platinum certification by the Spanish Music Producers for units of over 120,000 sales plus track-equivalent streams.

Formats and track listings
Digital download
"Encantadora" – 4:00

Digital download (Remix)
"Encantadora"  – 4:12

Credits and personnel
Willy Colón – acoustic guitar
Ismael Guerra – recording engineer
Mike Fuller – mastering
Martin Nieves – assistant engineer
Farruko – songwriting
Egbert "Haze" Rosa Cintrón – producer, songwriting
Roberto "Earcandy" Vázquez – recording engineer, mixing
Yandel – lead vocals, songwriting

Charts

Weekly charts

Monthly charts

Year-end charts

Certifications

See also
List of Billboard number-one Latin songs of 2016

References

2015 songs
2015 singles
Sony Music Latin singles
Latin Grammy Award for Best Urban Song
Latin Grammy Award for Best Urban Fusion/Performance
Yandel songs
Farruko songs